John Emery Murdoch (May 10, 1927 – September 16, 2010) was an American academic. Educated in philosophy at the
University of Wisconsin–Madison, Murdoch spent most of his career at Harvard University. At Harvard, he was Professor of History of Science and Chair of the Department from 1966 to 1971 and 1974 to 1975. He specialized in ancient and medieval medicine and philosophy, and published numerous materials on the topic. Murdoch was awarded the George Sarton Medal in 2009 for his scholarship.

References 

1927 births
2010 deaths
Historians of science
Philosophers of science
Harvard University faculty
Scholars of medieval philosophy
University of Wisconsin–Madison College of Letters and Science alumni
Fellows of the Medieval Academy of America